The Tremblois-lès-Rocroi–Petite-Chapelle railway was a  long narrow gauge and later metre gauge railway in the north of France, the first section of which was put into service in 1895. It operated until 1950.

History 
The first, 12 km long section from Tremblois-lès-Rocroi to Rocroi line was built by the Chemins de fer départementaux des Ardennes in 1897 as a narrow-gauge railway with the unusual gauge of 800 mm. In 1903, following a change in the law, the line was converted to metre gauge. It was extended across the border to Petite-Chapelle in Belgium in 1905 and operated until 1950.

Stations

References 

Railway lines in Grand Est
800 mm gauge railways
Metre gauge railways in France
Metre gauge railways in Belgium
Chemins de fer départementaux des Ardennes
National Company of Light Railways